This is a timeline documenting the events of heavy metal in the year 2021.

Bands formed
 The Halo Effect

Bands disbanded
 Bodom After Midnight
 Demons & Wizards
 Hellyeah (hiatus)
 Lotus Eater
 Lovebites (hiatus)
 Meliah Rage (hiatus)
 Sixx:A.M. (hiatus)

Bands reformed
 Before the Dawn
 Deadguy
 Defleshed
 Mudvayne
 Mystic Circle
 Porcupine Tree
 Shadows Fall
 Sleeping by the Riverside
 Structures
 Vampires Everywhere!

Deaths
 January 6 – Paul de Leon, drummer of Las Cruces, died from COVID-19 at the age of 52.
 January 10 – Marsha Zazula, co-founder of Megaforce Records, died of cancer at the age of 68.
 January 13 – Tim Bogert, former bassist of Cactus and Vanilla Fudge, died of cancer at the age of 76.
 February 5 – Örs Siklósi, vocalist of AWS, died from leukemia at the age of 29.
 February 18 – Tony Matuzak, former guitarist of Lizzy Borden, died from undisclosed reasons at the age of 59.
 February 24 – Sean Kennedy, former bassist of I Killed the Prom Queen, died by suicide at the age of 35.
 March 7 – Lars-Göran Petrov, vocalist of Entombed A.D. and former vocalist of Entombed, died from bile duct cancer at the age of 49.
 March 8 – Adrian Bărar, guitarist of Cargo, died from COVID-19 at the age of 61.
 March 14 – Gerri Miller, former editor of Metal Edge, died of cancer at the age of 67.
 March 17 – Corey Steger, former guitarist of Underoath, died in a car accident at the age of 42.
 March 26 – Brett Bradshaw, former drummer of Faster Pussycat, died from undisclosed reasons.
 April 18 – Lars "Ratz" Ranzenberger, bassist of Metalium, died in an airplane crash at the age of 53.
 April 29 – John Hinch, former drummer of Judas Priest, died from undisclosed reasons at the age of 73.
 May 9 – Robb Farr, bassist of Warrior, died from undisclosed reasons at the age of 58.
 May 13 – William J. Tsamis, guitarist of Warlord, died from undisclosed reasons at the age of 60.
 May 17 – D.V. "Dirt" Karloff, former bassist of Society 1, died from undisclosed reasons at the age of 48.
 June 11 – Sven Gross, vocalist of Fleshcrawl, died from cancer at the age of 44.
 June 26 – Johnny Solinger, former vocalist of Skid Row, died from liver failure at the age of 55.
 June 29 – John Lawton, vocalist of Lucifer's Friend and former vocalist of Uriah Heep, died from undisclosed reasons at the age of 74.
 July 1 – Bryan St. Pere, drummer of Hum, died from undisclosed reasons at the age of 52.
 July 10 – Chris Hutka, former vocalist of The Bunny the Bear, died from undisclosed reasons.
 July 14 – Jeff LaBar, former guitarist of Cinderella, died from undisclosed reasons at the age of 58.
 July 14 – Gary Corbett, former touring keyboardist of Kiss and Cinderella, died from lung cancer.
 July 26 – Mike Howe, vocalist of Metal Church and former vocalist of Heretic, died by suicide by hanging at the age of 55.
 July 26 – Joey Jordison, drummer of Sinsaenum and Vimic, former drummer of Slipknot and Scar the Martyr, and former guitarist of Murderdolls, died from undisclosed reasons at the age of 46.
 August 8 – Tim Audette, former guitarist of Fuck the Facts, died from multiple sclerosis.
 August 22 – Eric Wagner, vocalist of The Skull and former vocalist of Trouble, died from COVID-19 at the age of 62.
 September 3 – Jochen Schröder, former guitarist of Rage, died from undisclosed reasons at the age of 58.
 October 13 – Andrea Haugen, former guest vocalist of albums by Cradle of Filth and Satyricon, and ex-wife of Emperor guitarist Samoth, died in the Kongsberg attacks at the age of 52.
 October 29 – Eric Greif, musician, producer, lawyer, longtime manager of Chuck Schuldiner/Death and president of Perseverance Holdings (overseeing Chuck Schuldiner's intellectual property rights) died of kidney failure and complications from diabetes at the age of 59.
 October 29 – Malcolm Dome, music journalist and author, credited with inventing the term "thrash metal", died from undisclosed reasons at the age of 66.
 November 18 – Mick Rock, photographer of numerous rock and metal bands including Mötley Crüe, Ozzy Osbourne, Thin Lizzy, and Jane's Addiction, died from undisclosed reasons at the age of 72.
 November 19 – Hank von Hell, former vocalist of Doctor Midnight & The Mercy Cult, died from undisclosed reasons at the age of 49.
 November 24 – Gared O'Donnell, vocalist of Planes Mistaken for Stars, died from esophageal cancer at the age of 44.
 December 17 – Matthew Wolfe, former drummer of Byzantine, died from a battle with addiction at the age of 46.
 December 19 – Ron Anderson, vocal coach for numerous vocalists of rock and metal bands including Guns N' Roses, Cinderella, Soundgarden, Avenged Sevenfold, Alter Bridge, Ozzy Osbourne, and Trivium, died from undisclosed reasons at the age of 75.

Events
 Numerous heavy metal-associated festivals, including Download, Wacken Open Air, Hellfest, Bloodstock Open Air, Maryland Deathfest, Sweden Rock Festival and Dynamo MetalFest, were scheduled to return in 2021 after the 2020 editions of those festivals were cancelled, due to the COVID-19 pandemic. Due to the ongoing pandemic, however, Sweden Rock, Hellfest, Download and Wacken Open Air were once again cancelled.
 Tommy Vext of Bad Wolves departs from the band, citing his conservative political beliefs as an issue.
 After nearly two decades with Nightwish, Marko Hietala departs from the band and the public eye, citing his struggles with chronic depression and his disillusionment with the music scene in general. Nightwish subsequently announced Jukka Koskinen of Wintersun as their session bass player for the Human. :II: Nature. World Tour.
 Martijn Westerholt announces that Charlotte Wessels, Otto Schimmelpenninck van der Oije, Timo Somers and Joey de Boer have departed from Delain and that the band will continue as a solo project.
 In January, Iced Earth founder Jon Schaffer appeared on the Most Wanted section of the FBI after being photographed taking part of the 2021 storming of the United States Capitol, on six felony charges, after turning himself in to authorities. On February 15, vocalist Stu Block and bassist Luke Appleton both announced their resignation from the band as a result of the event, along with Jake Dreyer to focus on his band Witherfall, thus leaving behind Schaffer and Brent Smedley with the fate of the band unknown.
 On February 2, Cannibal Corpse announced that Erik Rutan has officially joined the band as a full-time member. Rutan has been a live member since 2019, replacing Pat O'Brien, after the latter's 2018 arrest and subsequent legal problems.
 On April 13, Tom Hunting revealed that earlier in February he was diagnosed with squamous cell carcinoma of the stomach. For this reason, the release of the band's eleventh studio album Persona Non Grata has been postponed to November. It will coincide with the band's upcoming autumn tour, making it possible for Hunting to participate as well. According to Exodus members, he is expected to make a recovery.
 On May 24, Dave Mustaine announced that Megadeth had officially parted ways with David Ellefson for the second time, after sexual misconduct accusations. Later, in August, the band announced the return of former member James LoMenzo as a session bass player for the upcoming "Metal Tour of the Year".
 On June 18, Helloween released its sixteenth self-titled studio album, which marked the return of co-founder Kai Hansen and Michael Kiske as studio members, for the first time since their departures from the band in 1989 and 1993, respectively.
 On July 29, Stephen Pearcy revealed that he has been battling liver cancer during the last three years.
 On August 2, Rudy Sarzo announced his return to Quiet Riot,  as a personal request from Frankie Banali, in order for the band to have an original member after Banali's death. Sarzo will replace Chuck Wright at the conclusion of the band's 2021 tour.
 On August 2, Stu Block announced his return to Into Eternity, where he will be sharing vocal duties with Amanda Kiernan, who replaced Block in 2013 after he joined Iced Earth.
 On August 5, longtime guitarist Marc Rizzo confirmed his departure from Soulfly. The band subsequently announced Dino Cazares as Rizzo's replacement for the August–September U.S. tour.
 On August 13, Mikael Stanne announced the departure of longtime drummer Anders Jivarp and bassist Anders Iwers from Dark Tranquillity.
 On August 19, Destruction and founding member Mike Sifringer officially announced their split. Sifringer was replaced by Martin Furia.
 On August 22, Gloryhammer announced the departure of vocalist Thomas Winkler.

Albums released

January

February

March

April

May

June

July

August

September

October

November

December

References

Heavy metal
2020s in heavy metal music